Garcinia leptophylla is an evergreen flowering tree in the family Clusiaceae or Guttiferae. The specific epithet (leptophylla) comes from Greek leptos (= slender, slim), and phyllon (= leaf).

Distribution
It is native to Colombia, Bolivia, Peru, and northern Brazil.

Description
The sap is yellow and the petioles measure 2–3.5 centimeters in length. The leaves are elliptic to lanceolate in shape and are very coriaceous, and the base is attenuate or cuneate and the margin is entire. The flowers occur in fascicles of approximately 40 and their pedicels measure 1.5–2.5 centimeters in length. They have four green petals which are lanceolate to oblanceolate in shape and measure 4–5 x 3-3.5 millimeters and have truncate bases. The fruit is smooth and is green when immature and measures 2-2.2 x 1.7–1.9 centimeters. Its pedicel measures 2.7–3.5 centimeters in length. It is a dioecious species but has been recorded to have some level of self-pollination.

Uses
An extract from the leaves has been proven to induce an antinociceptive effect, and it is used in folk medicine in South America.

See also
Garcinia
List of Garcinia species

References

leptophylla
Flora of Peru
Flora of Brazil
Flora of Bolivia
Flora of Colombia
Medicinal plants of South America
Trees of the Amazon
Trees of western South America
Plants described in 2018